Hanna El-Nachar is a Lebanon international rugby league footballer who plays as a  for the Penrith Panthers in the NSW Cup.

Background
El-Nachar is of Lebanese descent.

Playing career

Club career
El-Nachar came through the youth system at the Penrith Panthers, playing in the Harold Matthews Cup in 2017, Laurie Daley Cup in 2018, the S.G. Ball Cup in 2018 and 2019 and the Jersey Flegg Cup side in 2021 and 2022. He progressed into the Penrith NSW Cup side in 2022, featuring in two games.

International career
In 2022 El-Nachar was named in the Lebanon squad for the 2021 Rugby League World Cup.

He made his international debut in October 2022 against New Zealand in Warrington.

References

External links
Penrith Panthers profile
Lebanon profile

Living people
Penrith Panthers players
Rugby league props
Lebanon national rugby league team players
Year of birth missing (living people)